Frederick William I may refer to:

Frederick William I, Duke of Saxe-Weimar (1562–1602)
Frederick William, Elector of Brandenburg, the "Great Elector" of Brandenburg-Prussia (1620–1688)
Frederick William I, Duke of Schleswig-Holstein-Sonderburg-Beck (1682–1719)
Frederick William I of Prussia (1688–1740)
Frederick William, Elector of Hesse (1802–1875)

See also
Frederick William (disambiguation)
Friedrich Wilhelm (disambiguation)